Maple Creek was a federal electoral district in Saskatchewan, Canada, that was represented in the House of Commons of Canada from 1917 to 1953. This riding was created in 1914 from parts of Moose Jaw riding.

It was abolished in 1952 when it was redistributed into Swift Current riding.

Election results

By-election: On Mr. Spence's resignation, 14 October 1927

 
|Farmer
|HOLLIS, Annie L. ||align=right|2,388

See also 

 List of Canadian federal electoral districts
 Past Canadian electoral districts

External links 
 

Former federal electoral districts of Saskatchewan